"Lookin' After No. 1" is the first single by The Boomtown Rats. It appears on their first album The Boomtown Rats. The single was released in August 1977 after the band had performed a five-date tour supporting Tom Petty and the Heartbreakers. "Lookin' After No. 1" was the first so-called new wave single to be playlisted by the BBC and the Boomtown Rats subsequently became the first New Wave band to be offered an appearance on Top of the Pops, performing the song. The song reached number 2 on the Irish Singles Chart and spent nine weeks in the UK Singles Chart reaching a peak of number 11. Different covers were produced for releases in the Netherlands and Japan. Reviewer David Clancy described the song as having a "breakneck sneering selfishness".

The single was the first of ten consecutive single releases by The Boomtown Rats to reach the Top 40 in the UK chart.

Before the band's break-up in 1986, they played "Lookin' After No. 1" as the last song of their final performance, part of the Self Aid Irish fundraiser.

Personnel
 Bob Geldof – vocals, saxophone
 Pete Briquette – bass guitar, vocals
 Gerry Cott – guitar
 Johnnie Fingers – keyboards, vocals
 Simon Crowe – drums, vocals
 Garry Roberts – guitar, vocals

References

1977 debut singles
The Boomtown Rats songs
Songs written by Bob Geldof
1977 songs
Ensign Records singles
Columbia Records singles